Sergach is a town and the administrative center of Sergachsky District in Nizhny Novgorod Oblast, Russia, located on the Pyana River (Sura's tributary),  southeast of Nizhny Novgorod, the administrative center of the oblast. Population:

History
The village of Sergach was first mentioned in 1649. It was granted town status in 1779.

Administrative and municipal status
Within the framework of administrative divisions, Sergach serves as the administrative center of Sergachsky District. As an administrative division, it is, together with two rural localities, incorporated within Sergachsky District as the town of district significance of Sergach. As a municipal division, the town of district significance of Sergach is incorporated within Sergachsky Municipal District as Sergach Urban Settlement.

Transportation
The town is located on one of Russia's high-speed railways connecting Moscow with Kazan and has its own railway station.

References

Notes

Sources

Cities and towns in Nizhny Novgorod Oblast
Sergachsky District
Sergachsky Uyezd
Populated places established in 1649